Agonopterix costaemaculella is a moth in the family Depressariidae. It was described by Hugo Theodor Christoph in 1882. It is found in the Russian Far East (Amur and Primorye regions and the Kuriles), Japan and the Himalayas.

References

Moths described in 1882
Agonopterix
Moths of Asia